This is a list of countries by research and development (R&D) spending in real terms and as per latest data available. Gross domestic spending on R&D is defined as the total expenditure (current and capital) on R&D carried out by all resident companies, research institutes, university and government laboratories, etc., in a country. It includes R&D funded from abroad, but excludes domestic funds for R&D performed outside the domestic economy.

List
Only those nations which annually spend more than 50 million dollars have been included. The world's total nominal R&D spending was approximately one trillion dollars in 2010.

See also
Business R&D intensity by country
List of companies by research and development spending
List of countries by number of scientific and technical journal articles
List of countries by number of scientists and researchers 
List of U.S. states by research and development spending
Science of science policy
Science policy

References

Research And Development Spending